Julia Hartwig-Międzyrzecka (14 August 1921 – 14 July 2017) was a Polish writer, poet and translator, considered to be one of Poland's most important poets.

Life and career
She was born and raised in Lublin. She studied Polish and French literature at Warsaw University and continued her studies at the Catholic University of Lublin. Her first poems appeared in the journal Odrodzenie in 1944. Hartwig lived in Paris from 1947-50. In 1954, she published Z niedalekich podróży (From Nearby Places), a collection of articles. She published her first collection of poetry Pożegnania (Farewells) in 1956.

She lived in the United States from 1970 to 1974, later returning to Warsaw. During her time in America, Hartwig took part in the International Writing Program at the University of Iowa and also taught at several universities.

She published translations of French poetry by Guillaume Apollinaire, Blaise Cendrars, Max Jacob, Henri Michaux, and Pierre Reverdy and wrote books on Apollinaire and Gérard de Nerval. She also published translations of American poets such as Robert Bly and Marianne Moore. Hartwig's poetry has been translated into English, French, Italian, Russian, Lithuanian, Serbian, Greek and German.

Hartwig was awarded the Jurzykowski Prize, the Thornton Wilder Prize from Columbia University's Translation Center and the Georg Trakl Poetry Prize. She received six nominations for the prestigious Nike Award. She is the winner of the 2014 Wisława Szymborska Award for her book of poetry Zapisane.

Personal life
In 1954, Hartwig married poet ; he died in 1996. She died on 14 July 2017 in Pennsylvania at the age of 95.

She was the sister of the prominent photographer Edward Hartwig.

Selected works
Sources.
 Wolne ręce (Free hands), poetry (1969)
 Wielki pościg (The big race), children's book (1969)
 Dwoistość (Duality), poetry (1971)
 Czuwanie (Vigilance), poetry (1978)
 Chwila postoju (A moment of rest), poetry (1980)
 Obcowanie (Communion), poetry (1987)
 Czułość (Tenderness), poetry (1992)
 Bez pozegnania (No Farewells) (2004), nominated for a Nike Award

Bibliography
 Polish bibliography 1988–2001

References

External links
 Cynthia L. Haven, “Invisible You Reign Over the Visible”: Julia Hartwig’s Reality Mysticism,"World Literature Today article from 2011, republished in Milena Jesenská blog.
Kannada translations of 5 Julia Hartwig poems by S. Jayasrinivasa Rao at https://avadhimag.in

1921 births
2017 deaths
20th-century Polish poets
Writers from Lublin
Polish translators
Polish women poets
International Writing Program alumni
20th-century Polish women writers
20th-century Polish writers
Polish expatriates in the United States
French–Polish translators
English–Polish translators
20th-century translators